Lasberg is a municipality in the district of Freistadt, located in Upper Austria. It has a population of 2832 inhabitants (1.1.2021).

Population

References

Cities and towns in Freistadt District